Miguel Fisac (1913–2006) was a Spanish architect, urban planner, and painter. He was a member of Opus Dei.

Biography 
Miguel Fisac Serna was born 29 September 1913 in Daimiel in Spain. His father was Joaquín Fisac, his mother Amparo Serna. He had six brothers and sisters, among them Dolores 'Lola' Fisac (1909-2005), who became one of the first female Opus Dei members. He moved to Madrid aged 17 to study architecture. He was member of Catholic organization Opus Dei from 1935 till 1955, when he left. He fled to France during the Civil War along with Opus Dei founder Josemaría Escrivá and a group of other members. He returned after the war, and graduated from ETSAM in 1942. He married Ana María Badell in 1957. He died 12 May 2006 in Madrid.

Works 
 Centro de Estudios Hidrográficos, Madrid (1963)
 Laboratorios Jorba, Madrid, known as La Pagoda (1967, demolished 1999)

Gallery

References

External links

 Fundación Fisac

1913 births
2006 deaths
Spanish architects